Nightmare Honeymoon is a 1974 American crime-thriller film directed by Elliot Silverstein, starring Dack Rambo and Rebecca Dianna Smith.

Plot 
Newlyweds David and Jill Webb (Dack Rambo and Rebecca Dianna Smith) want nothing more than to consummate their marriage in New Orleans. But on their way to “The Big Easy,” they witness a murder. When the sadistic killer (John Beck) realizes he's been caught in the act, he knocks David unconscious and rapes Jill. Eventually, David learns the story of his wife's assault and sets out on a relentless vendetta to find the rapist and his partner and bring them to justice.

Cast 
 Dack Rambo as David Webb
 Rebecca Dianna Smith as Jill Binghamton Webb
 John Beck as Lee
 Pat Hingle as Mr. Binghamton
 Roy Jenson as Sandy
 David Huddleston as Pete Carroll
 Jay Robinson as Ruskin
 Dennis Patrick as John Kenmore
 Dennis Burkley as Bubba

Reception 
Hal C.F. Astell of Apocalypse Later Website said, "No, this is not intelligent stuff and I'm not even sure why it's (still available). Maybe it's because Elliot Silverstein, a director more prolific on TV than cinema screens, also made such cult favourites as Cat Ballou, A Man Called Horse and The Car. ... John Beck is the best reason to watch this film, even though he could easily have won the Best Overactor award that year with his bug eyes and twitches. He's just plain old fun to watch and by the time we get to the finale  I half expected Jill to run to him instead of her idiot husband..."

References

External links 
 
 

1974 films
1970s crime thriller films
American crime thriller films
American rape and revenge films
American films about revenge
Films directed by Elliot Silverstein
Films scored by Elmer Bernstein
Metro-Goldwyn-Mayer films
1970s English-language films
1970s American films